Czech Republic is competing at the 2013 World Championships in Athletics in Moscow, Russia, from 10–18 August 2013.

Team selection 

The Czech athletic federation is sending a 28-member strong team (14 women and 14 men) into the event including world season leader Zuzana Hejnová (400m Hurdles) and European indoor medalist from Gothenburg Pavel Maslák (400m).

Medalists 
The following competitors from the Czech Republic won medals at the Championships

Results 
(Q, q – qualified, NM – no mark, SB – season best)

Men

Women 

Heptathlon

 Athletes in italics did not race.

References

External links 
IAAF World Championships 2013 – Czech Republic

Nations at the 2013 World Championships in Athletics
World Championships in Athletics
2013